Peter Day may refer to:

 Peter Day (chemist) (born 1938), British inorganic chemist
 Peter Day (broadcaster) (born 1947), broadcaster on BBC radio
 Pete Day (born 1970), recording engineer, record producer and songwriter
 Peter Morton Day (1914–1984), journalist and ecumenical leader in the Episcopal Church in the United States